Ceuta is a Spanish autonomous city located to the south of the Strait of Gibraltar, in North Africa.

Ceuta may also refer to:
 , the name of four steamships of the Oldenburg Portuguese Line
 Spanish destroyer Ceuta, an Italian destroyer sold to the Nationalist faction of the Spanish Civil War in 1938
 AD Ceuta, a Spanish football team based in the autonomous city of Ceuta
 
Other places in the world:
 Ceuta, a fishing port in the Mexican state of Sinaloa
 Ceuta, a palafito village in the Lake of Maracaibo, Venezuela
 San Isidro de Ceuta, a harbor in Zulia, Venezuela
 Ceuta, a village in the province of Holguín, Cuba
 Ceuta, a village in the province of Villa Clara, Cuba
 Ceuta, a village in the department of Cundinamarca, Colombia